Richard Wiese (born July 13, 1959) is an American explorer, the longest serving President of The Explorers Club, and Executive Producer and Host of the multiple Emmy Award-winning ABC and PBS program, Born to Explore.

Early life and education
Wiese was born on Long Island, New York. His father, Richard Wiese, Sr., was the first man to fly solo across the Pacific Ocean in an aircraft.  Richard first climbed Mount Kilimanjaro in Tanzania at the age of 11. He attended St. Anthony's High School in Smithtown NY, and then Brown University. At Brown, he served as JFK Jr.’s big brother in their Phi Psi fraternity, subsequently graduating in  1982 with a Bachelor of Science in Geology and Biology.  He also studied Applied Physiology at Columbia University and completed the USDA Graduate Program in Meteorology.

Expeditions
With his love for exploration starting at an early age, as a teenager, Wiese helped create the first artificial reef in the Long Island Sound in 1977.
He has worked in Mexico's Yucatán jungle, placing satellite collars on jaguars. He also climbed and recovered samples from Tanzania's volcano Ol Doinyo Lengai, and also participated in two expeditions to Antarctica to core glaciers for climatological studies.

In 2006, he co-discovered 202 new forms of life in the first microbial survey of Central Park in New York, and founded the Central Park “Bio Blitz”: a 24 hour, cataloging of all life forms in the park. 

During the same period, Wiese joined a medical expedition on Mount Everest. He also skied cross-country to the North Pole, and was a member of a 2004 expedition to Yeronisos island in Cyprus, which consisted of an archaeological dig to find the birth temple of Caesarion, son of Cleopatra and Julius Caesar. 

In addition, he led a 2009 expedition to bio-prospect for extremophiles and new life forms in Mount Kilimanjaro's Ngorongoro Crater, resulting in the discovery of 29 new life forms. That expedition to Mount Kilimanjaro also involved placing the first weather station on its slopes, which has been crucial for tracking the effects of global warming. 

In 2020, Wiese traveled to the sub-arctic territory of the Yukon in Canada with HRH Prince Albert of Monaco to retrace the last 42-kilometre leg of the 1934 expedition to Telegraph Creek by his grandfather.

The Explorers Club

In 2002, Wiese was elected as the youngest club president in the organization’s history and has also been elected president to more terms (7) than any other president in its 118-year history. As the President of The Explorers Club, he developed and negotiated multi-year partnerships with Rolex, Microsoft, and Discovery Networks to name a few. 

During his tenure he established the first annual Global Exploration Summit in partnership with the nation of Portugal, which is often referred to as the “Davos of Exploration.” 

He is also the founder of The Explorers Club 50 - “Fifty people who are changing the world, that the world needs to know about”, as well as the organization’s first Diversity and Inclusion program. He also negotiated a three-book deal with Crowne/Random House. 
Wiese was invited and spoke at the United Nations on Global Climate change in 2019.
 He also climbed and sampled Tanzania's volcano Ol Doinyo Lengai and participated in two expeditions to Antarctica to core glaciers for climatological studies.

Media

Television series
Born to Explore with Richard Wiese was one of six original half-hour educational/informational (E/I) programs on Litton's Weekend Adventure.  The series aired Saturday mornings on ABC stations in the United States and was distributed internationally on National Geographic by Rive Gauche Television. The series premiered on September 3, 2011 and aired its final show on September 24, 2016.  In January 2017, Born to Explore debuted on American Public Television (APT) stations nationwide.

In 2012, Wiese won the Cronkite Award for Excellence in Exploration and Journalism and the series received a Daytime Emmy nomination for Outstanding Children's Series. In 2013, Born to Explore was nominated for 2 Daytime Emmys, including Outstanding Travel Program and won the Daytime Emmy for Outstanding Single Camera Photography. In 2014, the series received 5 Emmy nominations for Outstanding Travel/Adventure series, Outstanding Host in a Lifestyle/Travel Program, Outstanding Directing in a LIfestyle/Culinary Travel Program, Outstanding Writing Special Class, and Outstanding Music Composition and Direction. In 2015, the series was nominated for Outstanding Travel program and Outstanding Writing Special Class and won the Daytime Emmy® for Outstanding Sound Mixing. In 2016, Born to Explore received two nominations for Outstanding Travel and Outstanding Sound Mixing.  The series has been honored with the Parents’ Choice Gold Award for teens 13–16, the CINE Golden Eagle and numerous Telly awards.

 
The production team filmed in Botswana, Uganda, Iceland, England, Morocco, Australia, Canada, Hawaii, North Carolina, Chile, Cyprus, South Africa, Namibia, India, British Columbia, and South Dakota. Other locations included Scotland, Indonesia, India, South Africa, Namibia, Arizona, Maine and New York City.

From 2018 to 2019, Richard hosted 38 episodes of Weekend With Yankee on PBS’s Create.

TV & Film

Wiese appeared in two feature films: in 1981, in a brief scene with Brooke Shields in Endless Love and in 1986, as ‘Chris’ in Club Paradise. He was host of Exploration with Richard Wiese, a TV series that was syndicated in the U.S. and distributed internationally. He also hosted Hell on Earth, which aired on Discovery in the U.S. and BBC in the UK. He also hosted NOW ( Network of the World) in London with Brian Cox.

Wiese also occasionally appeared in various skits on Saturday Night Live in the 1980’s.

Popular Media
In 2003, he was named as one of People Magazine’s “Hottest Bachelors.” He has appeared on Late Night with Craig Ferguson, CNN, Dateline, FOX News, BBC, MSNBC, ABC News, CBS Morning Show, Good Morning America, WB11’s Morning Show, and many other programs, as well as in USA Today, the New York Times, Newsday, People, Esquire, Science, the Washington Post, National Geographic, the Los Angeles Times, the Times of London, Wine Spectator, and Forbes.

Print
Wiese is the author of the guidebook, Born to Explore: How to Be a Backyard Adventurer, published by Harper in 2009.

Honors
In 2006, the American Museum of Natural History Expeditions named Wiese as an ‘Explorer in Residence.’ He was honored at the 2005 Boy Scout National Jamboree, where he addressed 90,000 people and had a camp named after him. By invitation of King Mohammad VI, he was the U.S. representative to the Moussem de Tan Tan, a gathering of 45,000 nomadic Arabs in Morocco, and he received a Special Lifetime Achievement Award by the Science Museum of Long Island. As a journalist, he has received numerous honors, including multiple Emmy Awards’s, a Genesis Award, an Associated Press Folio Award, and a Golden Halo Advertising Award for Best Environmental/Wildlife Campaign.

Personal life
Wiese lives in Weston, Connecticut with his wife and three children.

References

External links
richardwiese.com
Richard Wiese Bio on Born to Explore

1959 births
American explorers
Living people
People from Long Island
American male writers
People from Weston, Connecticut
American scientists